The Coaldale Copperheads are a Junior "B" Ice Hockey team based in Coaldale, Alberta, Canada. They are members of the South Division of the Heritage Junior B Hockey League (HJHL). They play their home games at Coaldale Arena.

The 2014-15 season saw the Copperheads win their first HJHL championship and went on to Hockey Alberta Provincials. The Copperheads would once again represent the HJHL at provincials in 2017-18 as south division champions after losing the 2018 league final to the Red Deer Vipers. The Copperheads have never qualified for the medal round at provincials.

Season-by-season record  

Note: GP = Games played, W = Wins, L = Losses, T = Ties, OTL = Overtime Losses, Pts = Points, GF = Goals for, GA = Goals against, PIM = Penalties in minutes

Russ Barnes Trophy
Alberta Jr B Provincial Championships

See also
List of ice hockey teams in Alberta

External links
Official website of the Coaldale Copperheads

Ice hockey teams in Alberta
2007 establishments in Alberta
Ice hockey clubs established in 2007
Lethbridge County